Stadion Grüne Au is a multi-use stadium in Hof, Germany.  It is currently used mostly for football matches and is the home of Bayern Hof.  The stadium has a capacity of 8,100 people.  It opened in 1913. Attendance record is 19,100 during a Bundesliga promotion game against Rot-Weiss Essen in 1968.

References

External links
Venue information at europlan-online.de
Photos at stadionwelt.de

Grune Au
Buildings and structures in Hof, Bavaria
Sports venues in Bavaria
Sport in Upper Franconia